Ry Cooder is the debut album by roots rock musician Ry Cooder, released in 1970.

Track listing

Side 1
"Alimony" (Brenda Lee Jones, Welton Young, Robert Higginbotham) - 2:55
"France Chance" (Joe Callicott) - 2:45
"One Meat Ball" (Louis C. Singer, Hy Zaret; arranged by Van Dyke Parks) - 2:27
"Do Re Mi" (Woody Guthrie) - 3:03
"My Old Kentucky Home (Turpentine & Dandelion Wine)" (Randy Newman) - 1:45
"How Can a Poor Man Stand Such Times and Live?" (Alfred Reed) - 2:45

Side 2
"Available Space" - instrumental (Ry Cooder) - 2:11
"Pigmeat" (Huddie Ledbetter) - 3:07
"Police Dog Blues" (Arthur Blake; adapted by Ry Cooder) - 2:43
"Goin' to Brownsville" (John Estes; adapted by Ry Cooder) - 3:24
"Dark Is the Night" - instrumental (Blind Willie Johnson; adapted by Ry Cooder) - 2:48

Personnel
Ry Cooder - guitars, vocals, mandolin, bass guitar
Van Dyke Parks - piano
Chris Ethridge (contribution not specified in sleeve notes) - bass guitar
Richie Hayward (contribution not specified in sleeve notes) - drums
Roy Estrada (contribution not specified in sleeve notes) - bass guitar
Milt Holland (contribution not specified in sleeve notes) - drums, percussion
John Barbata (contribution not specified in sleeve notes) - drums 
Max Bennett (contribution not specified in sleeve notes) - bass guitar
Bobby Bruce (contribution not specified in sleeve notes) - violin
Gloria Jones & Co. - backing vocals
Kirby Johnson - orchestration and conductor on "One Meat Ball", "Do Re Mi", "Old Kentucky Home" and "How Can a Poor Man Stand Such Times and Live?"

Production
Van Dyke Parks - producer, arrangement on "One Meat Ball"
Lenny Waronker - producer
Judy Betz - production assistant
Lee Herschberg - engineer, mix-down
Doug Botnick - engineer
Thaddeus James Lowe - engineer
Rudy Hill - engineer
Bob Kovach - engineer

Other credits
Airstream - for the 1937 trailer pictured on the front of the album sleeve
Frank Bez - for the photo of the Airstream trailer (photographed at dry lake El Mirage)
Susan Titelman - for the photo of Cooder on the back of the album sleeve
Ed Thrasher - for art direction
John Uomoto - for the title neon lettering

References

LP Sleeve Notes

Billboard charts

1970 debut albums
Ry Cooder albums
Albums produced by Lenny Waronker
Reprise Records albums
Albums produced by Van Dyke Parks
Albums recorded at United Western Recorders